Timo von Gunten (born December 15, 1989) is a Swiss director, writer and producer. Best known for his work on La femme et le TGV as director, which earned him critical appraisal and recognition including a nomination for an Academy Award for Best Live Action Short Film at the 89th Academy Awards in 2017. He plays the cello in the symphonic orchestra TiFiCo.

Filmography
 2016 Le Voyageur
 2016 La femme et le TGV
 2016 Alice from Switzerland
 2014 Mosquito (Short)
 2013 Poupée (Short)
 2013 Eastern Winds (Short)
 2011 Acht Blumen (Short)
 2011 Monsieur Du Lit (Short)
 2011 Klimahandel (Short)
 2009 Band2gether (Film musical)

Awards
 2016 Nomination: Academy Award for Best Live Action Short Film
 2015 Winner, Best Screenplay: CWA Competition LA for La femme et le TGV
 2015 Grand Jury Prize, Best Screenplay: trms Award for La femme et le TGV
 2015 Scholarship from the canton of Zurich to work creatively abroad
 2015 Winner: Int. Jaipur Film Festival, India, Best Picture Mosquito
 2014 Winner: NYC Picture Start Film Festival, Best Cinematography Mosquito
 2014 Closing Ceremony Film, BBC Film Festival Aan Korb, London Eastern Winds
 2013 Winner: Swiss Short Film Festival, Los Angeles Poupée
 2013 Director's Choice Award, Lucerne Dance Film Festival Eastern Winds
 2012 Winner: Unica Award Swiss Youth Film Festival Monsieur du Lit
 2012 Winner: Swiss Hotel Film Award Monsieur du Lit
 2012 Winner: Film Festival Schaffhausen Monsieur du Lit
 2011 Winner: Haba Youth Prize, Uster Acht Blumen
 2011 Winner: Int. Social Media Film Festival, Las Vegas Acht Blumen
 2011 Winner: Int. Filmfestival Luzern, Best Picture Acht Blumen
 2012 Winner: Short Short Film Festival, Rhode Island, USA Monsieur du Lit

External links
 
 BMC Films official website

References

1989 births
Living people
Swiss directors
Swiss producers
Swiss writers